The Valbellahorn is a mountain of the Plessur Alps, located between Arosa and Wiesen in the canton of Graubünden.

References

External links

 Valbellahorn on Hikr

Mountains of the Alps
Mountains of Graubünden
Mountains of Switzerland
Arosa
Davos